An electric piano is a musical instrument which produces sounds when a performer presses the keys of a piano-style musical keyboard. Pressing keys causes mechanical hammers to strike metal strings, metal reeds or wire tines, leading to vibrations which are converted into electrical signals by magnetic pickups, which are then connected to an instrument amplifier and loudspeaker to make a sound loud enough for the performer and audience to hear. Unlike a synthesizer, the electric piano is not an electronic instrument. Instead, it is an electro-mechanical instrument. Some early electric pianos used lengths of wire to produce the tone, like a traditional piano. Smaller electric pianos used short slivers of steel to produce the tone (a lamellophone with a keyboard & pickups). The earliest electric pianos were invented in the late 1920s; the 1929 Neo-Bechstein electric grand piano was among the first. Probably the earliest stringless model was Lloyd Loar's Vivi-Tone Clavier. A few other noteworthy producers of electric pianos include Baldwin Piano and Organ Company and the Wurlitzer Company.

Early electric piano recordings include Duke Ellington's in 1955 and Sun Ra's India as well as other tracks from the 1956 sessions included on his second album Super Sonic Jazz (a.k.a. Super Sonic Sounds). The popularity of the electric piano began to grow in the late 1950s after Ray Charles's 1959 hit record "What'd I Say", reaching its height during the 1970s, after which they were progressively displaced by more lightweight electronic pianos capable of piano-like sounds without the disadvantages of electric pianos' heavy weight and moving mechanical parts. Another factor driving their development and acceptance was the progressive electrification of popular music and the need for a portable keyboard instrument capable of high-volume amplification. Musicians adopted a number of types of domestic electric pianos for rock and pop use. This encouraged their manufacturers to modify them for stage use and then develop models primarily intended for stage use.

Digital pianos that provide an emulated electric piano sound have largely supplanted the actual electro-mechanical instruments in the 2010s, due to the small size, low weight and versatility of digital instruments, which can produce a huge range of tones besides piano tones (e.g., emulations of Hammond organ sounds, synthesizer sounds, etc.). However, some performers still perform and record with vintage electric pianos. In 2009, Rhodes produced a new line of electro-mechanical pianos, known as the Rhodes Mark 7, followed by an offering from Vintage Vibe.

History

The Neo-Bechstein electric piano was built in 1929. The Vierlang-Forster electric piano was introduced in 1937. The RCA Storytone electric piano was built in 1939 in a joint venture between Story & Clark and RCA. The case was designed by John Vassos, the American industrial designer. It debuted at the 1939 World's Fair. The piano has normal strings and hammer action but no soundboard. The sound is amplified through electromagnetic pickups, circuitry and a speaker system, making it the world's first commercially available electric piano.

Many types were initially designed as a less-expensive alternative to an acoustic piano for home or school use. Some electric pianos were designed with multiple keyboards that could be connected for use in school or college piano labs, so that teachers could simultaneously instruct a group of students using headphones.

Types

"Electric piano" is a heterogeneous category encompassing several different instruments which vary in their sound-producing mechanisms and consequent timbral characters.

Struck strings

Yamaha, Baldwin, Helpinstill and Kawai's electric pianos are actual grand or upright pianos with strings and hammers. The Helpinstill models have a traditional soundboard; the others have none, and are more akin to a solid-body electric guitar. On Yamaha, Baldwin and Kawai's pianos, the vibration of the strings is converted to an electrical signal by piezoelectric pickups under the bridge. Helpinstill's instruments use a set of electromagnetic pickups attached to the instrument's frame. All these instruments have a tonal character similar to that of an acoustic piano.

Struck reeds

Wurlitzer electronic pianos (sometimes called "Wurli" as a nickname) use flat steel reeds struck by felt hammers. The reeds fit within a comb-like metal plate, and the reeds and plate together form an electrostatic or capacitive pickup system, using a DC voltage of 170v. This system produces a very distinctive tone – sweet and vibraphone-like when played gently, and developing a hollow resonance as the keys are played harder. The reeds are tuned by adding or removing mass from a lump of solder at the free end of the reed. Replacement reeds are furnished with a slight excess of solder, and thus tuned "flat"; the user is required – by repeated trial and error – to gradually file off the excess solder until the correct tuning is achieved. The Columbia Elepian (also branded as Maestro), the Brazilian-made Suette, and the Hohner Electra-Piano use a reed system similar to the Wurlitzer but with electromagnetic pickups similar to the Rhodes piano.

Struck tuning-forks

The tuning fork here refers to the struck element having two vibrating parts – physically it bears little resemblance to a traditional type. In Fender Rhodes instruments, the struck portion of the "fork" is a tine of stiff steel wire. The other part of the fork, parallel and adjacent to the tine, is the tonebar, a sturdy steel bar which acts as a resonator and adds sustain to the sound. The tine is fitted with a spring which can be moved along its length to allow the pitch to be varied for fine-tuning. The tine is struck by the small neoprene (originally felt) tip of a hammer activated by a greatly simplified piano action (each key has only three moving parts including the damper). Each tine has an electromagnetic pickup placed just beyond its tip (see also tonewheel). The Rhodes piano has a distinctive bell-like tone, fuller than the Wurlitzer, with longer sustain and with a "growl" when played hard.

Plucked reeds

The Hohner Pianet uses adhesive pads made from an undressed leather surface cushioned by a foam rubber backing. The leather is saturated with a viscous silicone oil to adhere to and pluck metal reeds. When the key is released, the pad acts as a damper. An electrostatic pickup system similar to Wurlitzer's is used. The tone produced resembles that of the Wurlitzer but brighter and with less sustain, largely owing to the design having no sustain pedal mechanism. The same firm's "Cembalet" uses rubber plectra and separate urethane foam dampers but is otherwise almost identical. Hohner's later "Pianet T" uses silicone rubber suction pads rather than adhesive pads and replaces the electrostatic system with passive electromagnetic pickups similar to those of the Rhodes, the reeds themselves however being magnetized. The Pianet T has a far mellower sound not unlike that of the Rhodes instruments. None of the above instruments have the facility for a sustain pedal.

A close copy of the Cembalet is the "Weltmeister Claviset", also marketed as the "Selmer Pianotron". This has electromagnetic pickups with a battery-powered preamplifier, and later models have multiple tone filters and a sustain pedal.

Other electric keyboard instruments

Although not technically pianos, the following are electric harpsichords and clavichords.

Baldwin's "Solid-Body Electric Harpsichord" or "Combo Harpsichord" is an aluminum-framed instrument of fairly traditional form, with no soundboard and with two sets of electromagnetic pickups, one near the plectra and the other at the strings' midpoint. The instrument's sound has something of the character of an electric guitar, and has occasionally been used to stand in for one in modern chamber music. Roger Penney of Bermuda Triangle Band worked on the design and development of the original instrument for the Cannon Guild Company, a premier harpsichord maker located in Cambridge, Massachusetts. This instrument had an aluminium bar frame, a spruce wood soundboard, bar magnetic pickups, and a Plexiglas (clear plastic) openable lid. The prototypes and design were sold to Baldwin who made some modifications, and then manufactured the instrument under their own name.

Hohner's "Clavinet" is essentially an electric clavichord. A rubber pad under each key presses the string onto a metal anvil, causing the "fretted" portion of the string to vibrate. When the key is released, the whole string is theoretically free to vibrate but is immediately damped by yarn woven across the tuning machine-head end. Two electromagnetic single-coil pickups, one under and one over the strings, detect the vibrations which are then pre-amplified and filtered in preparation for amplification by a guitar amp.

See also 
Celesta
DX7 Rhodes
Rocksichord

References

External links 

 Simons Hall of Electric Pianos